Ancient Manipur may refer to:
 Ancient Kangleipak, an antique civilization in Northeast India
 Manipura (Mahabharata), an ancient coastal kingdom mentioned in the Hindu epic Mahabharata